A guppy is species of tropical fish.

Guppy or GUPPY may also refer to:


People
 Guppy (surname)
 John Guppy Troup (born 1950), professional ten-pin bowler

Transportation
 Greater Underwater Propulsion Power Program (GUPPY) a U.S. submarine propulsion program
 Cony Guppy, a 1960s small pickup truck manufactured by Aichi
 Nuffield Guppy, a small military parachute-droppable vehicle of the 1940s intended to be used by paratroopers
 Guppy, the sailboat used by Laura Dekker in her world circumnavigation

Other uses
 Guppy (album), a 2017 album by Charly Bliss
 Guppy (film), a 2016 Indian Malayalam film
 Guppy, a type of handhold in climbing and bouldering

See also
 Aero Spacelines Pregnant Guppy
 Aero Spacelines Mini Guppy
 Aero Spacelines Super Guppy
 Bubble Guppies, a Nickelodeon animated children's TV show
 Joshua James Guppey (1820–1893), American lawyer, politician, Civil War officer and pioneer